Brett Rosebury (born 19 March 1980) is an Australian rules football field umpire in the Australian Football League (AFL). He has umpired 418 career games in the AFL since his debut in Round 13, 2000, as of the end of the 2017 season. He umpired his 350th AFL game in Round 4, 2017, in a match between GWS and Port Adelaide.

Rosebury commenced his umpiring career with the South Suburban Junior Football Umpires Association (SSJFUA) in Western Australia, and umpired his first match in the West Australian Football League (WAFL) at only 18 years of age, which is believed to be a record for the youngest officiating umpire in that league. He umpired the 1999 and 2000 WAFL Grand Finals.

Rosebury was one of four senior AFL umpires appointed during the 2000 AFL season. He is the youngest ever field umpire to officiate in matches at VFL/AFL level.

Rosebury was named the All-Australian Umpire for 2008, but was not selected to umpire the 2008 Grand Final. Instead, he was appointed emergency for the Grand Final, whilst Scott McLaren, Michael Vozzo and Shaun Ryan took the field. This experience has been a driving force in Rosebury's subsequent success.

Rosebury was a clerk with a mining company before being enlisted by the AFL, and now works as the Head Operations Accountant at Ticketmaster.

Rosebury has umpired the AFL Grand Final on nine occasions: 2009, 2010 and its replay, 2011, 2012, 2013, 2015, 2018, and 2021, which as of 2021 is the second-most of any umpire, and generally performs the game's opening bounce.

References

External links 
 Brett Rosebury at AFL Tables

Australian Football League umpires
West Australian Football League umpires
1980 births
Living people